The list of ship decommissionings in 1994 includes a chronological list of all ships decommissioned in 1994.


See also 

1994
 
Ship